The 1972–73 season was the 93rd season of competitive football by Rangers.

Overview
Rangers played a total of 53 competitive matches during the 1972–73 season. The season was the club's centenary year. After a stuttering start to the league campaign, three defeats and a draw from the first six matches, the sides fortunes greatly improved. From October to the end of the season Rangers suffered only one league defeat, at home to Hearts on 2 December 1972, and went on a run of sixteen wins. However this run was not enough to become league champions as the side finished second, one point behind Celtic.

In the cup competitions, the Scottish Cup campaign was to culminate in a 3–2 win over Celtic. The final was attended by Princess Alexandra along with 122,714 other spectators. It was Rangers first Scottish Cup win in seven years. The League Cup run was ended in the semi-finals at the hands of Hibernian after a 1–0 defeat.

This season also saw Rangers compete in the first ever European Super Cup. The side played the European Cup holders Ajax in January 1973. The Dutch side were the only continental opposition the side faced that season due to the club's European competition ban. In the end Ajax proved too strong and recorded a 6–3 aggregate win, with Rangers losing 1–3 at Ibrox and 3–2 in Amsterdam.

Results
All results are written with Rangers' score first.

Scottish First Division

European Super Cup

Scottish Cup

League Cup

Appearances

See also
 1972–73 in Scottish football
 1972–73 Scottish Cup
 1972–73 Scottish League Cup
 1972 European Super Cup

References 

Rangers F.C. seasons
Rangers